Dongguan Times or Dongguan Shibao is a Dongguan-based Chinese daily newspaper, and is the only local morning metropolitan newspaper in Dongguan.

History
Dongguan Times was sponsored and is supervised by the Dongguan Daily Agency (东莞日报社). The paper was founded by Zhou Zhichen (周智琛) on March 26, 2008.

Tan Junbo (谭军波), co-founder of Southern Metropolis Daily, was the editor-in-chief of Dongguan Times, who resigned in 2017.

References

External links
 Current official website of Dongguan Times. dgtimes.timedg.com
 Current official website of Dongguan Times. epaper.timedg.com

Dongguan
Mass media in Guangdong
Newspapers established in 2008
Daily newspapers published in China
Chinese-language newspapers (Simplified Chinese)
2008 establishments in China